The third season of The Golden Girls premiered on NBC on September 19, 1987, and concluded on May 7, 1988. The season consisted of 25 episodes.

Broadcast history
The season originally aired Saturdays at 9:00–9:30 pm (EST) from September 19, 1987, to May 7, 1988.

Episodes

Awards and nominations
40th Primetime Emmy Awards
Nomination for Outstanding Comedy Series
Award for Outstanding Lead Actress in a Comedy Series (Beatrice Arthur) (Episode: "My Brother, My Father")
Nomination for Outstanding Lead Actress in a Comedy Series (Rue McClanahan) (Episode: "Strange Bedfellows")
Nomination for Outstanding Lead Actress in a Comedy Series (Betty White) (Episode: "Bringing Up Baby")
Award for Outstanding Supporting Actress in a Comedy Series (Estelle Getty) (Episode: "Old Friends")
Nomination for Outstanding Guest Performer in a Comedy Series (Herb Edelman) (Episode: "The Audit")
Nomination for Outstanding Guest Performer in a Comedy Series (Geraldine Fitzgerald) (Episode: "Mother's Day")
Nomination for Outstanding Directing for a Comedy Series (Terry Hughes) (Episode: "Old Friends")

45th Golden Globe Awards
Award for Best Comedy Series
Nomination for Best Actress in a Comedy Series (Beatrice Arthur)
Nomination for Best Actress in a Comedy Series (Rue McClanahan)
Nomination for Best Actress in a Comedy Series (Betty White)

Writers Guild of America Awards
Nomination for Outstanding Writing for a Comedy Series (Kathy Speer & Terry Grossman) (Episode: "Old Friends")Directors Guild of America Awards''
Nomination for Outstanding Directing for a Comedy Series (Terry Hughes) (Episode: "Old Friends")

DVD release
The Region 1 DVD was released on November 22, 2005. The Region 2 and 4 DVD were respectively released on January 9 and January 11, 2006.

References

External links

Golden Girls (season 3)
1987 American television seasons
1988 American television seasons